The qualification for the 2020 men's Olympic beach volleyball tournament allocated quota places to 24 teams. A maximum of two teams per country are allowed to qualify.

Qualification summary

Host country

FIVB reserved a vacancy for the Olympics host country to participate in the tournament.

FIVB Beach Volleyball Olympic Qualification Tournament

The top two teams from the FIVB Beach Volleyball Olympic Qualification Tournament qualified.

World Championships

One team qualified from the 2019 World Championships.

Ranking
15 teams qualified from the Olympic Ranking.

Continental Cup
One winner from each Continental Cup qualified for the Olympics.

Africa

Asia and Oceania

Europe

North America

South America

References

Qualification for the 2020 Summer Olympics
Impact of the COVID-19 pandemic on the 2020 Summer Olympics